Labé (Pular/𞤆𞤵𞤤𞤢𞤪: 𞤍𞤢𞤤𞤭𞥅𞤪𞤫 𞤂𞤢𞤦𞤫) is a prefecture in the Labé Region of Guinea. The capital is Labé. The prefecture covers an area of 3,014 km.² and has an estimated population of 204,000.

References

Sub-prefectures
The prefecture is divided administratively into 13 sub-prefectures:
 Labé-Centre
 Dalein
 Daralabe
 Diari
 Dionfo
 Garambé
 Hafia
 Kaalan
 Kouramangui
 Noussy
 Popodara
 Sannou
 Tountouroun

Prefectures of Guinea
Labé Region